Song of the Pines: A Story of Norwegian Lumbering in Wisconsin is a children's historical novel which was written by the husband and wife team of Walter and Marion Havighurst.

 Song of the Pines (Philadelphia, PA: John C. Winston Company; first edition. 1949) was part of the "Land of the Free" series of children's books. The book   highlighted the contribution of Norwegian immigrants to the Wisconsin logging industry.  The book focuses on the story of a 15-year-old orphan named Nils who emigrates to America in the 1850s. Nils is a trained knife sharpener who sets up a business making cant hooks, a traditional logging tool. The novel was edited by Erick Berry and illustrated by the artist Richard Floethe (1901-1988). First published in 1949, it became a Newbery Honor recipient in 1950.

References

Other sources
Schmidt, Gary D. (2013) Making Americans: Children's Literature from 1930 to 1960 (University of Iowa Press) 
Silvey,  Anita (ed) (2002) The Essential Guide to Children's Books and Their Creators (Houghton Mifflin) 

1949 American novels
1949 children's books
Children's historical novels
American children's novels
Newbery Honor-winning works
Novels set in Wisconsin
Norwegian-American culture in Wisconsin
Works about Norwegian-American culture
Novels about immigration to the United States